Janssen-Fritsen Gymnastics b.v. is a manufacturer of professional gymnastics equipment and apparatus, based in the Netherlands. Janssen-Fritsen has supplied equipment to a number of world, European and continental championships, and four Olympic Games.

In the mid-1990s the company pioneered the design of the vaulting table, a replacement for the pommel horse-like apparatus used since the 19th century in international competitions. The vaulting table, first introduced at the international level at the 2001 World Artistic Gymnastics Championships, has been used in Gymnastics at the 2004 and the 2008 Summer Olympics.  The switch in apparatus has made the sport safer and enabled the introduction of more spectacular vaults, including Yurchenko-style vaults.

References

Gymnastics equipment manufacturers
Manufacturing companies of the Netherlands
Privately held companies of the Netherlands